The 1996–97 Saint Mary's Gaels men's basketball team represented Saint Mary's College of California in the 1996–97 college basketball season, coached by Ernie Kent for the 6th and final season. The Gaels competed in the West Coast Conference and played their home games at the McKeon Pavilion. They finished conference play with a record of 10–4 to place second. They won the 1997 West Coast Conference men's basketball tournament to receive an automatic bid to the 1997 NCAA Division I men's basketball tournament where they entered as the No. 14 seed West Region. The Gaels were beaten by No. 3 seed Wake Forest in the opening round to end their season 23–8.

Roster

Schedule and results
Source
All times are Pacific

|-
!colspan=9 style=| Regular season

|-
!colspan=9 style=| WCC tournament

|-
!colspan=10 style=| NCAA tournament

References

Saint Mary's
Saint Mary's Gaels men's basketball seasons
Saint Mary's
Saint Mary's Gaels men's basketball
Saint Mary's Gaels men's basketball